The UAAP Season 68 men's basketball tournament is the men's basketball tournament of A.Y. 2005–06 season of the University Athletic Association of the Philippines (UAAP). The tournament was hosted by Adamson University. ABS-CBN covered the games on Studio 23.

At the end of the elimination round, the FEU Tamaraws finished on top of the team standings; the defending champions De La Salle Green Archers was tied with the Ateneo Blue Eagles and the UE Red Warriors for second. By virtue of a better point differential from games among the three teams, La Salle clinched the second seed; Ateneo and UE played for the #3 seed, a game Ateneo won. FEU and La Salle won convincingly against Ateneo and UE respectively in the semifinals to set up a rematch of the previous year's finals series. In the finals, the FEU Tamaraws defeated De La Salle Green Archers in two close games (both games were decided in the final minute) to win the championship.

FEU Tamaraw Arwind Santos was named season and finals Most Valuable Player.

At the end of the tournament, La Salle returned their 2005 runner-up and 2004 championship trophies to the league after it was revealed they fielded two ineligible players. The league decided to suspend La Salle for the succeeding season in both divisions for all events, and the 2004 championship trophy was awarded to FEU.

Coaches

Current coaches
  – Mel Alas
  – Norman Black
  – Franz Pumaren
  – Bert Flores
  – Manny Dandan
  – Dindo Pumaren 
  – Lito Vergara
  – Nel Parado

Coaching changes

Elimination round

Match-up results

Scores
Results on top and to the right of the dashes are for first-round games; those to the bottom and to the left of it are second-round games.

Third seed playoff
Since La Salle, Ateneo and UE finished the eliminations with identical 10-4 cards, the quotient system was used. La Salle emerged with the best quotient among the three, so UE and Ateneo figured for a one-game playoff for the third seed. The winner will face the second seed, while the loser will face the first seed. The top two seeded teams possess the twice-to-beat advantage.

Bracket

Semifinals
Both FEU and La Salle only has to win once in the series, while their opponents have to win twice to qualify for the Finals.

La Salle vs. Ateneo

With La Salle routing Ateneo in their two elimination round games, Ateneo's LA Tenorio led the Eagles in the first half, with the Eagles leading by three points at halftime. Tenorio will finish the game with a team-high 20 points, along with six rebounds, three assists and four steals. La Salle's go-to guy Joseph Yeo scored 23 of his 28 points in the second half to blow the game wide open; he led the 11–0 run at the third quarter to erase Ateneo's three-point halftime lead to a 43–31 La Salle lead. Ateneo will not catch up, and La Salle qualifies for the finals with a 74–57 victory.

FEU vs. UE

First seed FEU Tamaraws eliminated the UE Red Warriors 78–57. FEU coach Bert Flores remarked that one of the reasons why Arwind Santos skipped the 2005 PBA Draft was to win the championship for the year after losing last year's championship series.

Finals
The Finals is a best-of-three series; the team that wins twice wins the championship.

Game 1

La Salle led for much of the first half, leading 43–29. Arwind Santos led a 13–0 run to trim the lead by one point at halftime. FEU led for the third quarter, but La Salle cut the gap to one point at the end of that quarter. La Salle continued their run at the fourth quarter, capped off by Joseph Yeo who gave the lead to La Salle 73–70 with 1:37 left in the game. Later, Santos made a three-pointer to tie the game at 73–all with 48.6 seconds left. With La Salle failing to score on their possession, Santos scored on a put-back with 5.5 seconds remaining. JV Casio missed a three-pointer at the other end, and Rico Maierhofer missed the put-back to clinch FEU's game 1 victory. Yeo finished with 26 points, while Santos had a double-double of 29 points and 14 rebounds. At the end of the game, La Salle assistant team manager Manny Salgado rushed to the court and hit Santos at the back of the head. The act was seen on national television.

FEU coach Bert Flores had to be restrained as he tried to go after Salgado who had run for safety. Salgado later said that while Santos and Yeo were exchanging words, he tried to pacify them but Santos uttered some foul words. Salgado lost his temper and threw a closed fist at the back of Santos' head. Salgado later issued an apology as La Salle condemned the act and will accept the decision of the UAAP Board. Subsequently, the UAAP Board unanimously banned Salgado for life at all UAAP events, the stiffest penalty on a team official.

Game 2

Finals Most Valuable Player: 

The Tamaraws led at the end of first quarter by eight points, but La Salle cut the lead to two by halftime. In the third quarter, Ryan Araña scored three three-pointers to put La Salle up by 11. The Tamaraws cut the lead to three early in the fourth quarter, capped off by Jeff Chan's three-point play. La Salle would still lead up to the final minute when Yeo fouled Mark Isip, who converted the three-point play to put FEU up 72–71. La Salle failed to score on their next possession, and they fouled Jonas Villanueva, who split his free-throws to end the game. Santos was named Finals MVP after having another double-double performance with 14 points, 13 rebounds and three blocks.

Awards

 
Most Valuable Player: 
Rookie of the Year: 
Mythical Five:
 
 
 
 
 
Defensive Player of the Year:

La Salle's suspension
On August 15, La Salle had received reports that the papers of their men's basketball players Mark Benitez and Tim Gatchalian were spurious. However, they took no action until a month later when the allegations were made public. At the end of the finals series, La Salle voluntarily gave up the 2004 championship trophy and the 2005 runner-up trophy to the league. The league, on April 22, 2006, suspended La Salle for the following season in all sports and in both Seniors and Juniors divisions for negligence, "as La Salle violated existing UAAP rules and regulations when it submitted the documents of Mark Benitez and Tim Gatchalian during the 2003-2004 season which proved to be spurious."

Broadcast notes

See also
NCAA Season 81 basketball tournaments

References

68
2005–06 in Philippine basketball
UAAP Season 68